Varanasi Tehsil is one of three tehsils (sub-districts) in the district of Varanasi in Uttar Pradesh state, India, the other two being Pindra and Raja Talab tehsils. Varanasi tehsil consists of Varanasi city urban and rural areas. It has 38 census towns and 835 villages.

Census towns
Varanasi Tehsil comprises 38 census towns. The biggest census town is Varanasi Municipal Corporation (population of 1,198,491) and smallest is Gaura Kala (population of 4,653). Following is the list of all the towns along with the population as per 2011 census.

 Varanasi Municipal Corporation : (1,198,491)
 Ramnagar Nagar Palika Parishad : (49,132)
 Lohta : (25,596)
 Phulwaria : (20,466)
 Shivdaspur : (16,405)
 Suzabad : (15,384)
 Kotwa : (14,394)
 Maruadih Railway Settlement Industrial Township : (14,298)
 Varanasi Cantonment Board : (14,119)
 Benipur : (12,470)
 Chhitpur : (12,156)
 Kandwa : (11,685)
 Sir Gobardhan : (11,350)
 Maruadih : (11,228)
 Susuwahi : (10,454)
 Salarpur : (10,126)
 Birbhanpur : (8,233)
 Harpal Pur : (7,710)
 Gangapur : (7,561)
 Kakarmatta : (7,377)
 Bhagawanpur : (7,269)
 Lerhupur : (6,934)
 Amara Khaira Chak : (6,577)
 Umarha : (6,429)
 Chandpur : (6,427)
 Dindaspur : (6,352)
 Kallipur : (6,295)
 Chhitauni : (6,195)
 Asapur : (6,153)
 Jalal Patti : (6,033)
 Kachnar : (5,870)
 Kotwa : (5,825)
 Maheshpur : (5,553)
 Kesaripur : (5,381)
 Parmanandpur : (5,139)
 Lahartara : (5,124)
 Sarai Mohana : (4,824)
 Gaura Kala : (4,653)

Villages
Varanasi Tehsil has 835 villages. Following is the list of all villages (along with village population as per 2011 Census) in Varanasi tehsil.

Climate

See also

 Pindra
 Varanasi

References 

Varanasi district
Tehsils of Uttar Pradesh